Aglossosia aurantiacella is a moth of the subfamily Arctiinae. It is found in the Democratic Republic of Congo.

References

Moths described in 1954
Lithosiini
Moths of Africa
Endemic fauna of the Democratic Republic of the Congo